Deities in ancient Mesopotamia were almost exclusively anthropomorphic. They were thought to possess extraordinary powers and were often envisioned as being of tremendous physical size. The deities typically wore melam, an ambiguous substance which "covered them in terrifying splendor" and which could also be worn by heroes, kings, giants, and even demons. The effect that seeing a deity's melam has on a human is described as ni, a word for the "physical creeping of the flesh". Both the Sumerian and Akkadian languages contain many words to express the sensation of ni, including the word puluhtu, meaning "fear". Deities were almost always depicted wearing horned caps, consisting of up to seven superimposed pairs of ox-horns. They were also sometimes depicted wearing clothes with elaborate decorative gold and silver ornaments sewn into them.

The ancient Mesopotamians believed that their deities lived in Heaven, but that a god's statue was a physical embodiment of the god himself. As such, cult statues were given constant care and attention and a set of priests were assigned to tend to them. These priests would clothe the statues and place feasts before them so they could "eat". A deity's temple was believed to be that deity's literal place of residence. The gods had boats, full-sized barges which were normally stored inside their temples and were used to transport their cult statues along waterways during various religious festivals. The gods also had chariots, which were used for transporting their cult statues by land. Sometimes a deity's cult statue would be transported to the location of a battle so that the deity could watch the battle unfold. The major deities of the Mesopotamian pantheon were believed to participate in the "assembly of the gods", through which the gods made all of their decisions. This assembly was seen as a divine counterpart to the semi-democratic legislative system that existed during the Third Dynasty of Ur ( 2112 BC –  2004 BC).

The Mesopotamian pantheon evolved greatly over the course of its history. In general, the history of Mesopotamian religion can be divided into four phases. During the first phase, starting in the fourth millennium BC, deities' domains mainly focused on basic needs for human survival. During the second phase, which occurred in the third millennium BC, the divine hierarchy became more structured and deified kings began to enter the pantheon. During the third phase, in the second millennium BC, the gods worshipped by an individual person and gods associated with the commoners became more prevalent. During the fourth and final phase, in the first millennium BC, the gods became closely associated with specific human empires and rulers. The names of over 3,000 Mesopotamian deities have been recovered from cuneiform texts. Many of these are from lengthy lists of deities compiled by ancient Mesopotamian scribes. The longest of these lists is a text entitled An = Anum, a Babylonian scholarly work listing the names of over 2,000 deities. While sometimes mistakenly regarded simply as a list of Sumerian gods with their Akkadian equivalents, it was meant to provide information about the relations between individual gods, as well as short explanations of functions fulfilled by them. In addition of spouses and children of gods, it also listed their servants.

Various terms were employed to describe groups of deities. The collective term Anunnaki is first attested during the reign of Gudea ( 2144 – 2124 BC) and the Third Dynasty of Ur. This term usually referred to the major deities of heaven and earth, endowed with immense powers, who were believed to "decree the fates of mankind". Gudea described them as "Lamma (tutelary deities) of all the countries." While it is common in modern literature to assume that in some contexts the term was instead applied to chthonic Underworld deities, this view is regarded as unsubstantiated by assyriologist Dina Katz, who points out that it relies entirely on the myth of Inanna's Descent, which doesn't necessarily contradict the conventional definition of Anunnaki and doesn't explicitly identify them as gods of the Underworld. Unambiguous references to Anunnaki as chthonic come from Hurrian (rather than Mesopotamian) sources, in which the term was applied to a class of distinct, Hurrian, gods instead. Anunnaki are chiefly mentioned in literary texts and very little evidence to support the existence of any distinct cult of them has yet been unearthed due to the fact that each deity which could be regarded as a member of the Anunnaki had his or her own individual cult, separate from the others. Similarly, no representations of the Anunnaki as a distinct group have yet been discovered, although a few depictions of its frequent individual members have been identified. Another similar collective term for deities was Igigi, first attested from the Old Babylonian Period ( 1830 BC –  1531 BC). The name Igigi seems to have originally been applied to the "great gods", but it later came to refer to all the gods of Heaven collectively. In some instances, the terms Anunnaki and Igigi are used synonymously.

Major deities
Samuel Noah Kramer, writing in 1963, stated that the three most important deities in the Mesopotamian pantheon during all periods were the deities An, Enlil, and Enki. However, newer research shows that the arrangement of the top of the pantheon could vary depending on time period and location. The Fara god list indicates that sometimes Enlil, Inanna and Enki were regarded as the three most significant deities. Inanna was also the most important deity in Uruk and a number of other political centers in the Uruk period. Gudea regarded Ninhursag, rather than Enki, as the third most prominent deity. An Old Babylonian source preserves a tradition in which Nanna was the king of the gods, and Anu, Enlil and Enki merely his advisers, likely a view espoused by Nanna's priests in Ur, and later on in Harran. An Old Babylonian personal name refers to Shamash as "Enlil of the gods," possibly reflecting the existence of a similar belief connected to him among his clergy too, though unlike the doctrine of supremacy of the moon god, accepted by Nabonidus, it found no royal support at any point in time. In Zabban, a city in the northeast of Babylonia, Hadad was the head of the pantheon. In the first millennium BCE Marduk became the supreme god in Babylonia, and some late sources omit Anu and Enlil altogether and state that Ea received his position from Marduk. In some neo-Babylonian inscriptions Nabu's status was equal to that of Marduk. In Assyria, Assur was regarded as the supreme god.

The number seven was extremely important in ancient Mesopotamian cosmology. In Sumerian religion, the most powerful and important deities in the pantheon were sometimes called the "seven gods who decree": An, Enlil, Enki, Ninhursag, Nanna, Utu, and Inanna. Many major deities in Sumerian mythology were associated with specific celestial bodies: Inanna was believed to be the planet Venus, Utu was believed to be the Sun, and Nanna was the Moon. However, minor deities could be associated with planets too, for example Mars was sometimes called Simut, and Ninsianna was a Venus deity distinct from Inanna in at least some contexts.

Primordial beings
Various civilizations over the course of Mesopotamian history had many different creation stories. The earliest accounts of creation are simple narratives written in Sumerian dating to the late third millennium BC. These are mostly preserved as brief prologues to longer mythographic compositions dealing with other subjects, such as Inanna and the Huluppu Tree, The Creation of the Pickax, and Enki and Ninmah. Later accounts are far more elaborate, adding multiple generations of gods and primordial beings. The longest and most famous of these accounts is the Babylonian Enûma Eliš, or Epic of Creation, which is divided into seven tablets. The surviving version of the Enûma Eliš could not have been written any earlier than the late second millennium BC, but it draws heavily on earlier materials, including various works written during the Akkadian, Old Babylonian, and Kassite periods in the early second millennium BC. A category of primordial beings common in incantations were pairs of divine ancestors of Enlil and less commonly of Anu. In at least some cases these elaborate genealogies were assigned to major gods to avoid the implications of divine incest.

Figures appearing in theogonies were generally regarded as ancient and no longer active (unlike the regular gods) by the Mesopotamians.

Minor deities

Monsters and apotropaic spirits

Foreign deities in Mesopotamia

See also
List of Elamite deities
List of Hittite deities
List of Hurrian deities
List of sukkals

References

Bibliography

 

 
Mesopotamian
Deities, Mesopotamian
Mesopotamian religion